The following is a list of seasons completed by the Coastal Carolina Chanticleers football team. The Chanticleers currently compete in the Sun Belt Conference, which participates in the NCAA Division I Football Bowl Subdivision (FBS). From the start of its football program in 2003 through 2016, Coastal was part of the Division I Football Championship Subdivision (FCS). From 2003 through 2015, Coastal was a member of the Big South Conference. In 2015, Coastal announced that it would start a transition to FBS in 2016, joining the Sun Belt Conference for all sports except football. The 2016 football season was played as an FCS independent, and in 2017 the Chanticleers joined Sun Belt football, though they were not eligible for the conference championship or bowl games until they became full FBS members in 2018.

The program began in 2003, but in the 19 seasons from through 2021, Coastal won seven conference championships, five as co-champions and two outright. They also qualified for the FCS playoffs six times, with quarterfinal appearances in 2013 and 2014.

The Chanticleers have had four head coaches in their brief history. David Bennett led the team for its first nine years, compiling a 63–39 record. Bennett was succeeded by Joe Moglia, who in six years compiled a 56–22 record. During the 2017 season, Moglia took a leave due to medical issues, and was replaced by interim head coach Jamey Chadwell, who guided the Chanticleers to a 3–9 record in their first season of Sun Belt play. Coastal Carolina beceame bowl-eligible in 2018,  and Chadwell became the program's third head coach on January 18, 2019. Upon Chadwell's departure to take the head coaching position at Liberty at the end of the 2022 regular season, defensive coordinator Chad Staggs led the Chanticleers in the Birmingham Bowl before being succeeded by NC State offensive coordinator Tim Beck.

Seasons

References

Coastal Carolina
Coastal Carolina Chanticleers football seasons